Shi Yao (born 13 January 1987) is a Chinese retired ice hockey goaltender. She was a member of the Chinese women's national ice hockey team and represented China in the women's ice hockey tournament at the 2010 Winter Olympics. At the 2012 IIHF Women's World Championship Division IB she was selected as Top Goaltender by the directorate.

References

External links
 
 
 
 
 
 

1987 births
Living people
Chinese women's ice hockey goaltenders
Sportspeople from Harbin
Ice hockey players at the 2010 Winter Olympics
Olympic ice hockey players of China
Asian Games medalists in ice hockey
Ice hockey players at the 2007 Asian Winter Games
Ice hockey players at the 2011 Asian Winter Games
Medalists at the 2007 Asian Winter Games
Medalists at the 2011 Asian Winter Games
Asian Games bronze medalists for China